Annapolis—Kings was a federal electoral district in the province of Nova Scotia, Canada, that was represented in the House of Commons of Canada from 1949 to 1953.

This riding was created in 1947 from Digby—Annapolis—Kings. It consisted of the counties of Annapolis and Kings. It was abolished in 1952 when it was redistributed into Digby—Annapolis—Kings riding.

Members of Parliament

This riding elected the following Members of Parliament:

Election results

See also 

 List of Canadian federal electoral districts
 Past Canadian electoral districts

External links 
 Riding history for Annapolis—Kings (1947–1952) from the Library of Parliament

Former federal electoral districts of Nova Scotia